Alexander Gore Kanengoni (17 September 1951 – 12 April 2016) was a Zimbabwean writer and veteran of the Zimbabwe War of Liberation.

Life 
Kanengoni trained as a teacher at Kutama College. He joined the Zimbabwe African National Liberation Army (ZANLA) in 1974, before enrolling at the University of Zimbabwe following independence in 1980. Kanengoni later worked for the Ministry of Education and Culture, the Zimbabwe Broadcasting Corporation and the Patriot newspaper.

He is best known for his war novel Echoing Silences, which has been described as 'an extraordinarily powerful novel, on a par with Bao Ninh's novel of the Vietnamese struggle, The Sorrow of War.' Alexandra Fuller dedicated her second novel,Scribbling the Cat, to Kanengoni. Fuller had never met Kanengoni, but considered him the metaphorical ‘godfather’ to her novel after she discovered Echoing Silencesin in Johannesburg airport.

Works

References

External links 
 Literary Encyclopedia

1951 births
2016 deaths
Alumni of Kutama College
University of Zimbabwe alumni
Zimbabwe African National Liberation Army personnel
Zimbabwean writers